The following lists events that happened during 1998 in Australia.

Incumbents

Monarch – Elizabeth II
Governor-General – Sir William Deane
Prime Minister – John Howard
Deputy Prime Minister – Tim Fischer
Opposition Leader – Kim Beazley
Chief Justice – Sir Gerard Brennan (until 21 May), then Murray Gleeson

State and Territory Leaders
Premier of New South Wales – Bob Carr
Opposition Leader – Peter Collins (until 8 December), then Kerry Chikarovski
Premier of Queensland – Rob Borbidge (until 20 June), then Peter Beattie
Opposition Leader – Peter Beattie (until 20 June), then Rob Borbidge
Premier of South Australia – John Olsen
Opposition Leader – Mike Rann
Premier of Tasmania – Tony Rundle (until 14 September), then Jim Bacon
Opposition Leader – Jim Bacon (until 14 September), then Tony Rundle
Premier of Victoria – Jeff Kennett
Opposition Leader – John Brumby
Premier of Western Australia – Richard Court
Opposition Leader – Geoff Gallop
Chief Minister of the Australian Capital Territory – Kate Carnell
Opposition Leader – Wayne Berry (until 20 February), then Jon Stanhope
Chief Minister of the Northern Territory – Shane Stone
Opposition Leader – Maggie Hickey
Chief Minister of Norfolk Island – George Smith

Governors and Administrators
Governor of New South Wales – Gordon Samuels
Governor of Queensland – Peter Arnison
Governor of South Australia – Sir Eric Neal
Governor of Tasmania – Sir Guy Green
Governor of Victoria – Sir James Gobbo
Governor of Western Australia – Michael Jeffery
Administrator of the Australian Indian Ocean Territories – Ronald Harvey (until 30 October)
Administrator of Norfolk Island – Tony Messner
Administrator of the Northern Territory – Neil Conn

Events

January
January – Floods in Katherine in the Northern Territory kill 3 people.
8 January – Prime Minister John Howard declines an offer to meet with British pop band, The Spice Girls.
28 January – Prime Minister John Howard unveils a new plan for training, education and expansion of the Work for the Dole Scheme aimed at easing youth unemployment.
30 January – Prime Minister John Howard visits the flood ravaged town of Katherine in the Northern Territory as flood waters claim their first victim.

February
2 – 13 February – Constitutional Convention is held to decide which model of republic should be put before the people of Australia in a referendum. The model chosen is one where the president is chosen by a joint sitting of both houses of parliament
4 February – The Federal Government gives short-term credit insurance to exporters to Indonesia to counter-act the effect of Indonesia's economic problems.
5 February – High Court of Australia judge Ian Callinan is accused of bias in the High Court challenge of the Hindmarsh Bridge.
21 February – Elections in the ACT re-elect the Liberal Party government of Kate Carnell. It would be the last State or Territory election that the Liberal Party have managed to form government after until the Western Australia state election in September 2008.
23 February–March – After generator breakdowns at four major coal-fired power stations, rolling blackouts hit the city of Brisbane and much of South-East Queensland.

March
3 March – Federal Speaker of the House of Representatives Bob Halverson resigns.
8 March – New South Wales Premier Bob Carr opens the Olympic Park Station on the new rail link between Sydney and the site for the 2000 Olympics.
12 March – 
The Senate votes against the Federal Government's plans to sell off the second portion of Telstra with the tied vote of Mal Colston.
The Federal Opposition alleges that Mining and Resources Minister Warwick Parer increased his ownership of a mining company during the first year of the Howard Government's office.
16 March – Prime Minister John Howard pledges a $50 million crime database investment if the Liberal Party is re-elected.
17 March – 
The Federal Government announces sweeping reforms to business rules to attract overseas companies to Australia.

April
2 April – Prime Minister John Howard pledges $270 million to keep the aged in their own homes and win back their support.
7 April – 3 June – Patrick Corporation sacks 2,000 dock workers to try to improve efficiency on the waterfront. In response, the Maritime Union of Australia stages possibly the largest industrial dispute Australia has ever seen. In the end, the jobs are restored to the workers in exchange for improvements in efficiency.
25 April – Prime Minister John Howard joins former prisoners of war in a ceremony at Hellfire Pass in Thailand, paying tribute to those who died building the Thai-Burma railway.

May
5 May – Fires caused by unsafe fuel hoses aboard the replenishment ship HMAS Westralia kill four people.

14 May – Prime Minister John Howard cuts defence ties and suspends all but the most vital humanitarian aid to India after the country carries out two more nuclear tests.
18 May – The value of the Australian dollar slumps to 62 and a quarter US cents, its lowest level in 12 years.  Prime Minister John Howard blames the fall in value on "poorly informed people on the other side of the world".
23 May – The Federal Court of Australia blocks construction of the Jabiluka uranium mine, granting to the traditional owners of the land a temporary injunction against work on the mine entrance.
24 May – 
Prime Minister John Howard opens the new Central Synagogue in Sydney to replace the former synagogue which burnt down in 1994.
Christopher Skase's passport is seized by Spanish officials and cancelled.  Mr. Skase applies for a renewal of his Spanish residency, which expired on 13 May and the Federal Government asks Spanish authorities to refuse the application, hoping it will force him home.
26 May – The first National Sorry Day is observed, on the first anniversary of the tabling of the report Bringing them Home which was the result of an inquiry into the removal of Aboriginal and Torres Strait Islander children from their families (the Stolen Generation).  The day was held annually until 2004.  It was renamed National Day of Healing from 2005.
27 May – The Australian Labor Party criticises the Queensland Coalition Government for its decision to put Pauline Hanson's One Nation party ahead of the Labor Party on how to vote papers for the upcoming Queensland State Election.
31 May – Prime Minister John Howard expresses Australia's concern about Pakistan's nuclear tests.

June
1 June – The Terminus Hotel in Wodonga, Victoria, burns down.
13 June – The Queensland state elections depose the ruling National Party government of Rob Borbidge & elect a minority ALP government, led by Peter Beattie. Pauline Hanson's One Nation scored 23% of the vote & 11 seats, leading to anti-racism protests & four former Prime Ministers to sign an open letter rejecting racism.
30 June – The Mercy Hospital in Albury, New South Wales, closes down its maternity unit. From 1 July, all babies are now born at the Wodonga Hospital in Wodonga, Victoria.

July
11 July – The Telstra sale bill is defeated in the Senate.  Prime Minister John Howard states the full sale of Telstra is still on the agenda for the next election.
15 July – Prime Minister John Howard stands firm against a Coalition backbench revolt on the full sale of Telstra.  Mr. Howard informs Parliament that the Government is committed to the Telstra sale.
21 July – Federal Treasurer Peter Costello admits he has been approached to challenge John Howard for the leadership of the Liberal Party.  Talk of the challenge overshadows a Cabinet meeting in regional Victoria.
 21 July – 5 September – The 1998 Sydney water crisis involved the suspected contamination by the microscopic pathogens cryptosporidium and giardia of the water supply system of Greater Metropolitan Sydney.
22 July – The Federal Government bows to the mounting pressure from backbenchers and rural voters by placing a 49% cap on the sale of Telstra.
26 July – Premier Bob Carr promises to help the victims of flooding in Narrabri, Wee Waa and Gunnedah.  The damage bill is expected to top $100 million.

August
13 August – The Coalition Tax Reform Package is launched and includes a 10 percent GST with the proceeds to be distributed to the states. Income tax will be lowered and the wholesale sales tax abolished, along with certain taxes on financial transactions.
16 August – Silk-Miller police murders: Two Victoria Police officers, Gary Michael Silk, 34, and Rodney James Miller, 35, are murdered in Moorabbin, Victoria.
17 August – Illawarra floods
28 August – President of Ireland, Mary McAleese pays a 10 day visit. 
29 August – The Liberal Party government of Tony Rundle is voted out in Tasmania & replaced with an ALP government of Jim Bacon.

September
17 September – Prime Minister John Howard terminates a radio interview in Sydney after being asked whether a GST will affect the price of heroin.
23 September – Federal Opposition Leader Kim Beazley launches Labor's election policy at the Brisbane Convention Centre, promising funding to a new jobs plan.  Prime Minister John Howard dismisses Mr. Beazley's job target as unrealistic.
25 September – A gas explosion at Esso's Longford plant killed 2, injured 8 & left most of Victoria without gas for two weeks. Hundreds of businesses were affected.

October
3 October – With the help of One Nation preferences, John Howard's Liberal/National coalition government is re-elected in the federal election.

November
6 November – Queensland's Electric Tilt Trains enter service
12 November – State Premiers and Territory Chief Ministers meet in Canberra with Prime Minister John Howard to discuss the sharing of funds from a goods and services tax.
15 November – Prime Minister John Howard arrives in Kuala Lumpur, Malaysia for the APEC Conference.
20 November – The High Court of Australia decides to allow uranium mining to proceed at Jabiluka in the Northern Territory.
29 November – Prime Minister John Howard joins in celebrations to mark the 50th anniversary of the first Holden motor car.

December
1 December – The Federal Government rejects an attempt by UNESCO to suspend construction of the Jabiluka uranium mine pending a further environmental impact report.
2 December – The Linton bushfire kills five volunteer firefighters in Linton, Victoria.
December – A man posts 28 mail bombs in a Canberra post office after losing a legal battle with the Australian Taxation Office which had been going since 1994. One of the bombs explodes, injuring two workers.
4 December – Colin Dunstan, aged 43, is arrested for the tax office mail bomb campaign.
14 December – New South Wales Premier Bob Carr opens extra lanes on the road the runs from Penrith to Strathfield.
19 December – A fire breaks out at the Country Comfort hotel in Albury, New South Wales, spreading up to the top floor.
20 December – Christopher Skase is rushed to a Majorca hospital just days after a Spanish court lifts an order preventing his deportation.

Full date unknown
The Wiggles re-release three videos after the video release of The Wiggles Movie, including Yummy Yummy, Wiggle Time, and Wiggledance!. However, Yummy Yummy and Wiggle Time contains new footage, as they have been re-recorded, Wiggledance! cuts out the song "Vini Vini".
Wilkins Farago book publishing house is founded in Melbourne.

Film
 2 May – Fox Studios Australia opens in Sydney on the site of the former Sydney Showgrounds.
 Babe: Pig in the City
 The Interview

Television
16 February – Long running British preschool series Teletubbies premieres on ABC.
27 March – Darwin finally gets a second commercial television station when TND-34 opens, taking a Seven Network affiliation.
WIN Television WA is granted a licence to broadcast to regional & remote Western Australia.
27 November – After 25 years, The Midday Show is axed by the Nine Network.
5 October – Pokémon begins on Network Ten.
December – The remote Central & Eastern Australia markets are aggregated, with Imparja taking a Nine Network affiliation & Seven Central (formerly QSTV) taking a joint Seven & Network Ten affiliation.

Sport

Australian Rules Football
26 September – The Adelaide Crows (15.15.105) defeat North Melbourne (8.22.70) to win the 102nd VFL/AFL premiership.
The Brownlow Medal was awarded to Robert Harvey of St Kilda
The Leigh Matthews Trophy was awarded to Wayne Carey of North Melbourne
The Coleman Medal was awarded to Tony Lockett of Sydney Swans
The Norm Smith Medal was awarded to Andrew McLeod of Adelaide Crows
The AFL Rising Star award was awarded to Byron Pickett of North Melbourne
The Wooden Spoon was 'awarded' to Brisbane

NSL
16 May – South Melbourne become Australian Champions for the third time in their history, beating newly formed Carlton SC in the National Soccer League Grand Final at Olympic Park.

Rugby League
13 March – The NRL competition kicks off, with the South Sydney Rabbitohs upsetting the Auckland Warriors 24–18 at Ericsson Stadium.
15 March – In their first match, the Melbourne Storm upset the Illawarra Steelers 14–12 at WIN Stadium. The Storm go on to have a remarkable debut season, going within one game of the grand final.
24 April – The Kangaroos play their first 'full-fledged' international match in four years. The Kiwis spoil the party however, winning 22–16.
12 June – Rugby league rocked by drugs scandal. Three Newcastle Knights players test positive, as do one Melbourne player & a Western Suburbs player.
23 September – The St. George Dragons & the Illawarra Steelers announce they will form the game's first joint venture team, the St George Illawarra Dragons.
27 September – Minor premiers the Brisbane Broncos defeat the Canterbury Bulldogs 38–12 to win the 91st NSWRL/ARL/NRL premiership. It is the first premiership held under the NRL name & the last grand final to be played at the Sydney Football Stadium (now Aussie Stadium). It is also the second consecutive premiership for the Broncos, if you count their 1997 success in Super League. The Western Suburbs Magpies finish in last position on points difference and points against, claiming the wooden spoon.
1 & 3 December – The Adelaide Rams & the Gold Coast Chargers are eliminated from the NRL competition for 1999.

Cricket
October – Mark Taylor equals Don Bradman's record of 334 in a test match against Pakistan. However, unlike Bradman, Taylor is not out & declares the innings closed when he reaches that score.
Shane Warne & Mark Waugh confess to accepting money from an Indian bookmaker when the Australian cricket team was on tour in Pakistan & Sri Lanka in 1994.

FINA
8 to 17 January – The VIII FINA World Championships are held in Perth. Ian Thorpe wins his first gold medal at a major meet in the 400m freestyle. Human growth hormone was found in a Chinese swimmer's bag at Sydney Airport, resulting in her deportation.

Motor Sport
8 March – Finnish driver Mika Häkkinen wins a controversial Australian Grand Prix ahead of McLaren teammate Scot David Coulthard after Coulthard moved over and allowed Häkkinen to take the race lead in the closing stages of the race.
4 October – Mick Doohan riding a Honda NSR500 won his third and final Australian motorcycle Grand Prix at the Phillip Island Grand Prix Circuit. The win secured Doohan's fifth consecutive World Championship victory.
4 October – Jim Richards and Swede Rickard Rydell win the Bathurst 1000 in their TWR prepared Volvo S40, defeating Richards' son Steven Richards and Brit Matt Neal in a Nissan Primera by the smallest competitive margin in the races history. It was Richards' sixth Bathurst victory.
8 November – Finnish driver Tommi Mäkinen won his second Rally Australia driving a Mitsubishi Lancer.
15 November – Jason Bright and Steven Richards in a Ford Falcon take victory in the Bathurst Classic, the first major victory for Stone Brothers Racing team.

Commonwealth Games
September – Australia comes home with a record 199 medals, 80 of them gold from the 1998 Commonwealth Games held in Kuala Lumpur, Malaysia.

Netball
7 August – The Adelaide Thunderbirds defeat the Sydney Swifts 48–42 in the Commonwealth Bank Trophy netball grand final

Horse Racing
3 November – Jezabeel wins the Melbourne Cup.

Miscellaneous
February – Zali Steggall wins bronze in the women's slalom at the 1998 Winter Olympics in Nagano, Japan. It is Australia's first ever individual Winter Olympic medal.
13 March – First day of the Australian Track & Field Championships for the 1997–1998 season, which are held at the Olympic Park in Melbourne, Victoria. The 10,000 metres was conducted at the Zatopek Classic, Melbourne on 18 December 1998. The men's decathlon event was staged at the Hobart Grand Prix on 21 – 22 February.
12 July – Greg Lyons wins the men's national marathon title, clocking 2:17:00 in Brisbane, while Lisa Dick claims her second women's title in 2:36:54.
December – Six sailors die in the Sydney to Hobart Yacht Race.

Births
 1 January – Lara Robinson, actress
 2 January – Jake Clifford, rugby league player
 14 January – Maddison Inglis, tennis player
 15 January – Alexandra Eade, artistic gymnast
 16 January
 Cameron Murray, rugby league player
 Jai Whitbread, rugby league player
 17 January – Sophie Molineux, cricketer
 5 February – Sara Tomic, tennis player
 12 February – Bilal Maarbani, rugby league player 
 17 February – Harry Grant, rugby league player
 24 February – Tom Highmore, Australian Rules footballer
 12 March – Jordan Jansen, singer
 14 March – Victor Radley, rugby league player
 30 March – Kalyn Ponga, rugby league player
 1 April – Isabella Bliss, chef
 3 April – Max Purcell, tennis player
 16 April – Jordana Beatty, actress
 22 April – Reed Mahoney, rugby league player
 29 April – Kimberly Birrell, German-born Australian tennis player
 30 April
 Oliver Anderson, tennis player
 Olivia DeJonge, actress
 10 May – Priscilla Hon, tennis player
 27 May – Brittany O'Brien, diver
 9 June – Moses Suli, rugby league player
 24 July – Bindi Irwin, television presenter
 1 August – Pasami Saulo, rugby league player
 5 August – Adam Doueihi, rugby league player
 15 August – Gulliver McGrath, actor
 19 August – Salesi Junior Fainga'a, rugby league player
 21 August – Sean O'Sullivan, rugby league player
 1 September – Emily Condon, footballer
 2 September – Gehamat Shibasaki, rugby league player
 9 September – Alexander Brimson, rugby league player
 19 October – Enari Tuala, rugby league player
 29 October – Kotoni Staggs, rugby league player
 3 November – Maddison Elliott, swimmer
 18 November – Nick Cotric, rugby league player
 8 December – Shai Bolton, Australia Rules footballer

Deaths
 16 January – Alphonse Gangitano, underworld criminal (b. 1957)
 22 January – Chilla Christ, cricketer (b. 1911)
 25 February – B. A. Santamaria, political activist and journalist (b. 1915)
 15 March – Afferbeck Lauder, author (b. 1911)
 28 April – Mum Shirl, Indigenous activist (b. 1924)
 13 June – Kathleen Funder, social scientist and researcher (b. 1941)
 17 July – Marc Hunter, singer, songwriter and record producer (born in New Zealand) (b. 1953)
 2 September – Tommy J. Smith, racehorse trainer (b. 1916)
 4 September – Elizabeth Kata, author (b. 1912)
 9 October – Ian Johnson, cricketer (b. 1917)
 21 November – Sir Otto Frankel, geneticist (born in Austria) (b. 1900)

See also
 1998 in Australian television
 List of Australian films of 1998

References

 
Australia
Years of the 20th century in Australia